State Route 98 (SR 98) is a north–south state highway located entirely in Lawrence County in Middle Tennessee. Its northern terminus is a junction with US 43 (SR 6) in Leoma, and its southern terminus is at the Alabama state line.

Route description

SR 98 passes mostly through rural farmland as a 2-lane highway for its entire length. About 7.6 miles south Leoma, it passes through the community of Five Points. It passes through Bonnertown immediately before crossing into Alabama. It is known as Rabbit Trail Road for its entire length.

Major intersections

See also

References
Mileage retrieved from DeLorme Street Atlas USA
Official Tennessee Highway Maps

098
098